Joseph Paul Lonnett (February 7, 1927 – December 5, 2011) was an American professional baseball catcher, and coach, who played in Major League Baseball (MLB) for the Philadelphia Phillies. He threw and batted right-handed.

Playing career
Lonnett graduated from Beaver Falls High School and signed with the Phillies in 1948, and spent much of his career with the Phillies as a Minor League Baseball (MiLB) catcher and manager, and MLB catcher and scout. He missed two seasons while serving in the United States Navy in World War II and the Korean War. Lonnett spent four MLB seasons a second-string receiver, appearing in 143 games, while batting .166, with six home runs (HR) and 27 runs batted in (RBI) — never once cracking the .200 level for a season.

Coaching career
Fellow Western Pennsylvania native Chuck Tanner had promised Lonnett that he would be one of his coaches if he ever became an MLB manager. Tanner honored his word when he named Lonnett and Al Monchak third- and first-base coaches respectively with the Chicago White Sox on October 2, 1970. All three would serve in similar capacities together with the White Sox (1971–75), Oakland Athletics (1976) and Pittsburgh Pirates (1977–84). 

When Tanner was traded to the Pirates for Manny Sanguillén — only the second trade in MLB history to involve a manager — Lonnett followed him to Pittsburgh. He wore Sanguillén's No. 35 jersey until the Pirates re-acquired Sanguillén a year later; after which, he wore No. 32. Eventually, Lonnett served as third-base coach on the Pirates' 1979 world championship team.

In , he was named the manager of the St. Catharines Blue Jays of the Short-Season 'A' affiliate of the Toronto Blue Jays in the New York–Penn League, which finished at 41–36, 4th in the NY–P Western Division.

Later life and death
In the final years of his life, Lonnett battled Alzheimer's disease and was cared for by his wife of 56 years, Alvida. In 2004, he attended the 25th anniversary celebration of the  World's Champs, at PNC Park.

Lonnett succumbed to his long-standing illness, in his home town of Beaver Falls, Pennsylvania, on December 5, 2011. He was 84.

References

References
 Marcin, Joe, and Byers, Dick, eds., The Official 1977 Baseball Register. St. Louis: The Sporting News, 1977.
 Thorn, John, and Palmer, Peter, eds., Total Baseball. New York: Warner Books, 1989.

External links

Joe Lonnett at SABR (Baseball BioProject)
Joe Lonnett at Baseball Almanac
Joe Lonnett at Baseball Library

 Pirates' Lonnett was a man who valued family Pittsburgh Tribune-Review, December 8, 2011
 Pittsburgh Post-Gazette Obit

1927 births
2011 deaths
Arkansas Travelers players
Baltimore Orioles (IL) players
Baseball players from Pennsylvania
Bradford Blue Wings players
Buffalo Bisons (minor league) players
Chicago White Sox coaches
Lockport Reds players
Louisville Colonels (minor league) players
Major League Baseball catchers
Major League Baseball third base coaches
Oakland Athletics coaches
People from Beaver Falls, Pennsylvania
Philadelphia Phillies players
Philadelphia Phillies scouts
Pittsburgh Pirates coaches
Rochester Red Wings players
Syracuse Chiefs players
Terre Haute Phillies players
Utica Blue Sox players
Vandergrift Pioneers players
Wichita Braves players
United States Navy personnel of World War II
United States Navy personnel of the Korean War